Stanley Joseph Bentham (17 March 1915 – 29 May 2002) was an English footballer.

Born at Leigh, Lancashire, in 1915, he had a trial with Football League club Bolton Wanderers as a teenager in the early 1930s but was not offered a professional contract and signed for non-league Wigan Athletic instead. He played five times for the club in the 1933-34 season as they won the Cheshire County League title, scoring three goals. He turned professional on 1 January 1935, still only aged 18, when First Division giants Everton signed him. He made his senior debut on 23 November 1935 in a league game against Grimsby Town at Blundell Park and was soon a regular first team player, missing just one league game in the 1938-39 season, but he was 23 years old when in September of that year World War II broke out and by the time league action resumed for the 1946-47 season, he was already 30 years old and had lost most of the prime years of his career.

He remained with Everton as a player before retiring at the end of the 1947-48 season, by which time he had played 125 competitive games for the Goodison Park club (110 of them in the league) and scored seven goals. He remained on the club's payroll as a coach until 1962, when he secured a similar position at Luton Town. This was his final job in football.

By the late 1990s, Bentham was suffering from Alzheimer's disease and was living in a nursing home at Southport by the time of his death in May 2002 at the age of 87.

References

External links

1915 births
2002 deaths
Footballers from Leigh, Greater Manchester
English footballers
Everton F.C. players
English Football League players
Wigan Athletic F.C. players
Association football wing halves
Deaths from Alzheimer's disease